Marian Dąbrowski (27 September 1878 in Mielec – 27 September 1958 in Miami) was a Polish journalist, entrepreneur and publisher, the biggest and the most influential press magnate of the Second Polish Republic.

Life and career
Between 1903 and 1907 he studied Polish philology at the Jagiellonian University in Krakow. Then took up the job of a teacher, but quit and began working as a secretary of the Ilustracja Polska magazine. In 1908 he became a journalist in the Glos Narodu magazine, two years later he founded his own newspaper, Ilustrowany Kurier Codzienny (Illustrated Daily Courier). The first issue of the IKC was printed on 18 December 1910; after a few years its circulation grew to 180,000.

In 1918, after World War I, Dabrowski started creating his own press empire, opening offices in several locations of the interbellum Poland. In 1927 he purchased the Nowa Reforma magazine and moved his business to a lavish building called Palac Prasy (Palace of the Press), located at 1 Wielopole Street in Krakow. In 1932 his company was worth some $1.5 mln, he employed around 1400 people and published 5 titles, including the flagship, Ilustrowany Kurier Codzienny.

Between 1921 and 1935 Dabrowski was member of the Polish Parliament, as a member of the Polish People's Party "Piast" (PSL Piast) and later, the Nonpartisan Bloc for Cooperation with the Government (BBWR). Since 1926 he supported the Sanacja, also was alderman of the city of Krakow. Dabrowski often helped those in need, he funded prizes for young painters, also financially supported construction of a new building of the National Museum of Poland. He came up with the idea of opening the Bagatela Theatre, also sponsored field works around the Krakus Mound.

For many years, Dabrowski was a member of Krakow's Association of Friends of Fine Arts, between 1935 and 1939 he was director of this organization. He supported development of sports, organizing various competitions. Also, he popularized the Tatra Mountains, for which he was named honorary citizen of Zakopane.

Death
Just before World War II, Dabrowski left Poland for France. The war turned out a catastrophe for his business. His savings quickly dried out, and he moved to Florida, where lived in poverty, forgotten and destitute. He died on the day of his 80th birthday, after several years urn with his ashes was brought to Krakow and buried at the Rakowicki Cemetery.

See also
List of Jagiellonian University people

References

External links
 

1878 births
1958 deaths
20th-century Polish journalists
Jagiellonian University alumni
Members of the Legislative Sejm of the Second Polish Republic
Members of the Sejm of the Second Polish Republic (1922–1927)
Members of the Sejm of the Second Polish Republic (1928–1930)
Members of the Sejm of the Second Polish Republic (1930–1935)
Nonpartisan Bloc for Cooperation with the Government politicians
People from Mielec
People from the Kingdom of Galicia and Lodomeria
Polish businesspeople
Polish emigrants to the United States
Polish People's Party "Piast" politicians